The Metuchen Post Office is a historic United States Post Office located at 360 Main Street in the Borough of Metuchen in Middlesex County, New Jersey. Listed as United States Post Office, it was added to the National Register of Historic Places on April 2, 2008, for its significance in architecture, art, communications, and politics/government.

History and description
Louis A. Simon, the Supervising Architect in the Office of the Supervising Architect for the U.S. Treasury, designed the building using Colonial Revival style. Construction began in 1939, with Neal A. Melick as Supervising Engineer. The one-story brick building was dedicated on February 10, 1940. The roof has a square cupola with a weathervane. The presence of a cupola helped indicate that this was a public building. The building remains essentially unchanged since it was built.

See also
 National Register of Historic Places listings in Middlesex County, New Jersey
 List of United States post offices

References

		
Metuchen, New Jersey
Buildings and structures in Middlesex County, New Jersey
National Register of Historic Places in Middlesex County, New Jersey
Post office buildings on the National Register of Historic Places in New Jersey
Government buildings completed in 1940
1940 establishments in New Jersey
Brick buildings and structures
New Jersey Register of Historic Places